The 2022 Iceland terror plot was an alleged plot to target Icelandic institutions and citizens of the state in September 2022. On 21 September, the Icelandic police arrested two individuals and seized dozens of firearms, including semi-automatic pistols and 3D-printed weapons, along with large amount of ammunition during a search in nine different locations. The alleged plot, which would be the first of its kind in the history of Iceland, was believed to include attacks on members of the police, the Icelandic parliament, Alþingi. The individuals further discussed murdering several high profile individuals, including Guðlaugur Þór Þórðarson, the Minister for the Environment and Natural Resources, Sólveig Anna Jónsdóttir, the chairman of the workers union Efling, and Gunn­ar Smári Egilsson, the chairman of the Icelandic Socialist Party.

On 9 December 2022, the two men where formally charged with attempted terrorism and weapons violations.

Reactions
In an interview with Stöð 2, the National Police Commissioner, Sigríður Björk Guðjónsdóttir, stated that there was no reason to raise the risk assessment due to threat of terrorism in the country following the arrests as the danger had surpassed.

The day after the arrests, the Icelandic neo-Nazi organization Norðurvígi made a statement where they denied any association with arrested individuals.

References

2022 crimes in Iceland
Failed terrorist attempts in Europe
Terrorist incidents in Europe in 2022